= Uchagaon =

- Village
- Location in Karnataka, India Uchagaon (India)
- Coordinates: 15.88°N 74.56°E
- Country: India
- State: Karnataka
- District: Belgaum
- Talukas: Belgaum

Population (2001)
  - Total: 7,716

Languages
  - Official: Kannada
- Time zone: UTC+5:30 (IST)
- 591128: 591128
- Nearest city Belgaum: Belgaum
- Climate: dry (Köppen)

Uchagaon is a village in the southern state of Karnataka, India. It is located in the Belgaum taluk of Belgaum district in Karnataka, and is the last village towards Maharashtra.

Malekrni Devi temple is famous in the village.

== Demographics ==
As of 2001 India census, Uchagaon had a population of 7716 with 3937 males and 3779 females.

== See also ==
- Belgaum
- Districts of Karnataka
